The eight F122 Bremen-class frigates of the German Navy was a series of frigates commissioned between 1982 and 1990. The design was based on the proven and robust Dutch  but used a different propulsion system and hangar lay-out. The ships were built for anti-submarine warfare as a primary task although they were not fitted with towed array sonars. They were also equipped for anti-surface warfare, while having anti-aircraft warfare point defences.

This class of ship was one of the last to be constructed under post-war displacement limitations imposed by the WEU on West Germany.

Prior to that the Bremen class served as the backbone of the German Navy.

Employment 
During the Cold War period, the ships' main war task was to escort convoys for reinforcement and resupply of allied forces in Europe in the Northern Atlantic. They frequently took part in NATO Standing Naval Forces. Since 1990, all ships have served in additional supporting missions such as the embargo operations against former Yugoslavia in the Adriatic Sea or Operation Enduring Freedom against the international terrorism.

During their lifetime, the ships' equipment has frequently been modernized and proven to be reliable platforms.

Notable actions

Karlsruhe successfully assisted an Egyptian freighter repel pirates on 25 December 2008 in the Gulf of Aden.

In 2012 Rheinland-Pfalz was reportedly used to gather intelligence on Syrian troop movements to be passed to the Free Syrian Army assist in their attacks on the Syrian Army.

In December 2015 Augsburg joined the French aircraft carrier  in the south-eastern Mediterranean Sea to go to the Arabian Sea as part of the intervention against ISIS in the Syrian Civil War.

Ships

All ships were based in Wilhelmshaven. Together they formed the 4. Fregattengeschwader (4th Frigate Squadron) of the German Navy.

Gallery

See also
List of frigates
List of German Federal Navy ships
List of naval ships of Germany
List of naval ship classes of Germany

References

Sources
 Website for all active and retired Frigate F213 Seamen
 
 naval-technology.com
 https://www.nytimes.com/2008/12/26/world/africa/26pirates.html?ref=world
 http://news.bbc.co.uk/2/hi/africa/7799796.stm

External links 
 

 
 
German involvement in the Syrian civil war